Final Theory may refer to:
 Theory of everything, a putative theory in physics
 Final Theory (novel), a 2008 science fiction novel by Mark Alpert